Poland has participated in the Eurovision Song Contest 24 times since its debut in .  Although Poland did not become a member of the European Broadcasting Union (EBU) until 1993, earlier contests had often been broadcast on Telewizja Polska (TVP), the Polish broadcaster.

Poland's debut in the contest in  remains its most successful entry, with Edyta Górniak finishing second. This remains Poland's only top five result in the contest. Poland then failed to qualify from the semi-finals in six out of seven years between 2005 and 2011, before withdrawing from the contest in 2012. The country failed to qualify three contests in a row (2018, 2019 and 2021), a streak that ended with Ochman finishing 12th in 2022.

History
The first ever performance by Poland was at the 1994 contest: Edyta Górniak's song, "To nie ja!" is also by far the most successful Polish entry to date, receiving 166 points and placing second. Poland was almost disqualified that year though; there was no free-language rule in operation at the time, and a furor erupted at the dress rehearsal when Górniak sung the second half of "To nie ja!" in English. Six national delegations formally petitioned for Poland to be disqualified; however Eurovision rules required a majority of delegations (13 in this case) to complain before the European Broadcasting Union could examine the case for disqualification, so Poland was allowed to remain.

The Polish entry for the 1995 contest was again selected through internal selection. It was Justyna Steczkowska with "Sama". Steczkowska could not replicate Górniak's 2nd place, receiving only 15 points and placing 18th out of 23.

During the competition in 1996, a qualifying round was organized with the aim of reducing the number of countries participating in the final of the competition. The qualifying stage was not televised or recorded, and national juries audited the studio versions of all competition proposals and awarded them points. Out of 29 works sent by public broadcasters, 22 entries qualified for the finals. The only country not participating in the qualifying round was the competition host, Norway. The 1996 entry was Kasia Kowalska with "Chcę znać swój grzech...". She qualified to the final and placed 15th with 31 points.

Poland competed in the 1997 competition with the song "Ale jestem", the first uptempo Polish entry, which was performed by Anna Maria Jopek. At the close of voting, she had received 54 points, placing 11th in a field of 25.
 
In 1998 Poland was represented by band Sixteen. They performed the song "To Takie Proste" in the final of the competition, finishing 17th of 25 entrants, receiving 19 points.

In 1999   represented Poland with the song "Przytul mnie mocno". He was the first male singer who represented Poland. He placed 18th with 17 points. Due to the low results over previous five years, Poland did not participate in the Eurovision Song Contest 2000.

Poland returned to the 2001 contest following an enforced one-year absence. However, after they placed 20th out of 23, they had to withdraw again from the Eurovision Song Contest 2002. They did however return in 2003.

For the 2003 contest Poland organized its first public selection for Eurovision entry;Ich Troje and some of the biggest Polish music acts, such as Wilki, Blue Café and Varius Manx , participated in the pre-selection, it was no surprise when the group Ich Troje won the public vote ahead of Blue Café, placing 7th of 26 countries in the final. This placing allowed Poland to skip the semi-final of the 2004 contest, automatically qualifying for the final.

The Polish entry for the 2004 contest was again selected through National Final, the Krajowe Eliminacje. The winner was Blue Café with "Love Song". Group could not repeat Ich Troje's 7th place, receiving only 27 points and placing 17th.

In 2005 TVP went back to an internal selection, picking "Czarna dziewczyna", a multilingual song performed in Polish and Russian. Poland competed at the semi-final for the first time. The song just missed out on a place in the final, coming 11th in the semi-final with 81 points, only 4 points behind Latvia.

Poland's 2006 entry was chosen with the comeback of the public vote on TVP. Ich Troje were chosen again in 2006 with song "Follow My Heart", but could not repeat their 7th place from 2003. They failed to qualify for the final, coming 11th with 70 points in the semi-final only 6 points behind Macedonia. Poland's 2007 entry, "Time To Party", sung by The Jet Set, only finished 14th in the semi-final.

Poland's only appearance in the final between 2005 and 2011, was in 2008. Even then, its song ("For Life", sung by Isis Gee) only qualified as a jury wildcard and placed a lowly 24th in the final, ahead of only United Kingdom.

In the 2009, Poland selected Lidia Kopania and her song "I Don't Wanna Leave". She performed in the second semi-final on 14 May 2009, however she failed to qualify, finishing 12th with 43 points.

The 2010 entry for Poland was Marcin Mroziński with song "Legenda". He performed in the first semi-final on 25 May 2010 but he didn't qualify for the final, finishing 13th with 44 points.

In 2011, Poland was represented by Magdalena Tul, and the country's entry was sung in Polish. Her song was called "Jestem", translated as "I am". Although initially a favorite with bookmakers, "Jestem" failed to qualify, finishing last 19th with 18 points in the first semi-final. This remains the worst Polish result to date.

Members of the Polish OGAE have said at their annual convention that they would like Edyta Górniak to represent Poland for a second time. For years it was unknown if Górniak would enter Eurovision again, until when in 2016 she made a second attempt at representing her country in the contest, placing third in the national final.

2012–2013 absence
In December 2011, it was announced that Poland will not compete at the Eurovision Song Contest 2012 in Baku. The Polish broadcaster stated that having to organize the European Football Championship 2012 (hosted by Poland and Ukraine) was a major factor in their non-participation.

Return
TVP, the Polish national broadcaster has confirmed on 5 December 2013 that Poland will return to the Eurovision Song Contest in 2014. On 25 February, it was announced that Donatan and Cleo would represent Poland with their song "My Słowianie". They qualified for the final placing 8th with 70 points, making it only the second time Poland has qualified for the final since 2008. Donatan and Cleo performed 9th in the final and ended up placing 14th out of 26, with 62 points. The duo fared clearly better with the televoters, finishing third in the semi-final and 5th in the final respectively.

In 2015 TVP has selected their entry internally again by choosing Monika Kuszyńska and her song "In the Name of Love". She was the first ever Eurovision participant to sit in a wheelchair during her performance, due to the fact that she was paralyzed after being involved in a serious car accident in 2006. Kuszyńska performed last in the second semi-final on 21 May 2015 and qualified for the final placing 8th with 57 points. In the final, she came 23rd out of 27 acts, receiving ten points. Alike Donatan and Cleo, she fared clearly better with the televoters, coming fourth in the semi-final and 15th in the final respectively.

At the beginning of October 2015, TVP confirmed its participation in the 61st Eurovision Song Contest. Although the original representative of the country was to be selected internally by the station's management, on January 26, 2016 TVP1 director informed that the Polish representative will be selected through national final. Because of this, the Krajowe Eliminacje returned in 2016. Edyta Górniak and some of the biggest Polish music acts, such as Margaret, Natalia Szroeder took part in the competition with Michał Szpak winning it. Szpak performed second in the second semi-final on 12 May 2016, and qualified for the final by finishing in sixth place, with 151 points. In the final, held on 14 May 2016, he performed 12th and placed 8th out of 26 acts, with 229 points, which gave Poland their third best result ever.

In 2017, TVP decided to host the second edition of the national final, the interest for turned out to be smaller. Kasia Moś and her song "Flashlight" was announced as a winner. Moś performed 11th in the first semi-final on 9 May 2017. She qualified for the final placing 9th with 119 points. In the final, held on 13 May 2017, she performed 2nd and came 22nd out of 26 acts with 64 points total.

Poland's run of qualifications came to an end in 2018, when the song "Light Me Up" by Polish DJ Gromee and Swedish vocalist Lukas Meijer, again chosen during the national final, failed to qualify to the final by placing 14th with 81 points in the second semi-final. It is the first Polish entry since its return to the contest in 2014, not to qualify for the final.

In 2019, TVP returned to an internal selection, after a successful internal choice of Roksana Węgiel who won the Junior Eurovision Song Contest 2018. On 15 February 2019, it was announced that TVP has chosen Tulia to represent Poland in Tel Aviv. However Poland failed to qualify for the grand final by placing 11th with 120 points in the first semi-final only 2 points behind Belarus.

In 2020, TVP used the talent show Szansa na Sukces to select the Polish artist and song, having used the show to select the song "Superhero" performed by Viki Gabor for the Junior Eurovision Song Contest 2019, which went on to win. Alicja Szemplińska won the national final with the song "Empires", winning both the public and the jury vote. However, the 2020 contest was later cancelled due to the COVID-19 pandemic.

In 2021, TVP used an internal selection. On 12 March 2021 during the TVP2 programme Pytanie na śniadanie it was announced that Rafał Brzozowski would represent the country with the song "The Ride". Poland failed to qualify for the final, placing 14th with 35 points in the second semi-final.

In 2022, TVP used the national final Tu bije serce Europy! Wybieramy hit na Eurowizję to select its entry. The national final was held on 19 February 2022, with 10 entries competing, and was won by Ochman with "River". Ochman performed 14th in the second semi-final on 12 May 2022. He qualified for the final placing 6th with 198 points. In the final, held on 14 May 2022, he performed 23rd, where he placed 12th with 151 points.

Participation overview

Awards

Barbara Dex Award

Related involvement

Commentators and spokespersons

Stage directors

Photogallery

See also
Poland in the Junior Eurovision Song Contest
Poland in the Eurovision Dance Contest

Notes

References

External links 
 Points to and from Poland eurovisioncovers.co.uk
 OGAE Poland official site eurowizja.org

 
Countries in the Eurovision Song Contest
Music competitions in Poland